Generator Collective is a political activism group based in the United States. It was founded in 2016 by actress and screen writer Ilana Glazer and former WeWork executive Glennis Meagher, with a goal of "lowering the barrier to entry" to discussing politics.

Background
Glazer and Meagher founded the campaign platform in 2016. The platform promotes female election candidates and general participation in democracy, voting and political discussion.

The group has staged events, sometimes called "Genny Social"s, to discuss politics.

References

External links

Voter turnout organizations
Youth politics
American companies established in 2016
Non-profit organizations based in the United States